This is a list of people who have been part of the production crew of the comedy style animated television series called Futurama.

Matt Groening - Writer, Producer, Creator (also the creator of the Simpsons)
David X. Cohen - Co-Creator, Writer, Executive Producer 
Peter Avanzino - Director
Susie Dietter - Director
Mark Ervin - Director
Ron Hughart - Director
Jeffrey Lynch - Director
Frank Marino - Director
Rich Moore - Director
Chris Louden - Director
Bret Haaland - Director
Chris Sauve - Director
Swinton O. Scott III - Director
Brian Sheesley - Director
Gregg Vanzo - Director
Dwayne Carey-Hill - Director
Carlos Baeza - Director
Claudia Katz - Producer
Eric Kaplan - Writer, Producer
Aaron Ehasz - Writer
J. Stewart Burns - Writer
David A. Goodman - Writer
Kristin Gore - Writer
Darin Henry - Writer
Eric Horsted - Writer
Ken Keeler - Writer
Brian Kelley - Writer
Lewis Morton - Writer
Bill Odenkirk - Writer
Patric Verrone - Writer
Dan Vebber - Writer
Ron Weiner - Writer
Jeff Westbrook - Writer

References

Crew